RAD50-interacting protein 1 is a protein that in humans is encoded by the RINT1 gene.

Interactions
RINT1 has been shown to interact with Rad50 and ZW10.

References

Further reading